is a 2010 Japanese romantic drama film directed by Tran Anh Hung, based on Haruki Murakami's novel of the same name. The film was released in Japan on 11 December 2010.

Plot
Toru Watanabe is a quiet and serious young man in 1960s Tokyo whose personal life is in tumult, having lost his best friend Kizuki after he inexplicably commits suicide. Seeking an escape, Toru enters a university in Tokyo. By chance, during a walk in a park, Toru meets Kizuki's ex-girlfriend Naoko, and they grow close. Naoko continues to be devastated by the loss of Kizuki and spirals into a deep depression.

Toru sleeps with Naoko on her 20th birthday. Shortly afterwards, Naoko withdraws from the world and leaves for a sanitarium in a remote forest setting near Kyoto. Toru is anguished by the situation, as he still has deep feelings for Naoko, but she is unable to reciprocate. He also lives with the influence of death everywhere, while Naoko feels as if some integral part of her has been permanently lost. He continues with his studies, and during the spring semester meets an attractive girl and fellow student Midori, who is everything that Naoko is not—outgoing, vivacious, and supremely self-confident.  The story then follows Toru as he is torn between the two women in his life, and choosing between his past and his future.

Cast
 Kenichi Matsuyama as Watanabe
 Rinko Kikuchi as Naoko
 Kiko Mizuhara as Midori Kobayashi
 Tetsuji Tamayama as Nagasawa
 Kengo Kora as Kizuki
 Reika Kirishima as Reiko Ishida
 Eriko Hatsune as Hatsumi
 Shigesato Itoi as the Professor
 Haruomi Hosono as the Record Shop Manager
 Yukihiro Takahashi as the Gatekeeper

Release
This film debuted in the 67th Venice International Film Festival where it competed for the Golden Lion. It was then subsequently released in Japanese cinemas on 11 December 2010.

In the United Kingdom, it was released on 11 March 2011. In the United States, the film had a limited release on 6 January 2012 in New York City and Washington D.C. In Canada, the film was released on 2 March 2012.

Reception

Critical reception
The Daily Telegraph said that director Tran Anh Hung was "brave" to attempt to bring Haruki Murakami's 1987 novel to the big screen but mentioned that "the film comes across as a mere summary of Murakami's book". Stephen Holden of The New York Times wrote that the film "registers less as a coherent narrative than as a tortuous reverie steeped in mournful yearning".

Accolades

Soundtrack
The score for the film's soundtracks was composed by Radiohead guitarist Jonny Greenwood. An original soundtrack album for the film was released on 10 November 2010, containing pieces from Greenwood's score, along with three songs used in the film by German Krautrock band Can, all originally released between 1969 and 1971.

Track list:

References

External links
 
 

2010 romantic drama films
2010 films
Films about depression
Films about suicide
Films based on works by Haruki Murakami
Films based on Japanese novels
Films directed by Tran Anh Hung
Films set in the 1960s
Films set in Tokyo
Films scored by Jonny Greenwood
Japanese coming-of-age films
Japanese romantic drama films
2010s Japanese-language films
2010s Japanese films
Toho films